Al Hajar is a village in Yemen, also known as Al Hajara`. It is located in the Ash Sharyah District of the Al Bayda' Governorate.

References 

Al Bayda Governorate